Nemanja Kartal (Cyrillic: Немања Картал; born 17 July 1994) is a Montenegrin professional footballer who plays as a central defender.

Club career
Born in Pljevlja, he started playing with local side FK Rudar Pljevlja youth teams where he was scouted by Greek side PAOK who brought him to their ranks in 2013. He spent a total of three and a half years with PAOK by playing on loan at several clubs. First at Greek sides Anagennisi Epanomi (second half of 2012–13) and Anagennisi Giannitsa (2013–14), and then two seasons with FK Slavija in the Premier League of Bosnia and Herzegovina.

International career
While still playing in Rudar Pljevlja youth teams, Kartal was spotted as a potential talented player and began playing for the Montenegrin U17 team in 2010. In spring 2016 he was back to the national team, this time to play for Montenegro U21.

In May 2016, he was part of Montenegro "B" team.

References

1994 births
Living people
Sportspeople from Pljevlja
Association football central defenders
Montenegrin footballers
Montenegro youth international footballers
Montenegro under-21 international footballers
PAOK FC players
Anagennisi Epanomi F.C. players
Anagennisi Giannitsa F.C. players
FK Slavija Sarajevo players
FK Radnički Niš players
FK Krupa players
FK Rudar Pljevlja players
OFK Grbalj players
Football League (Greece) players
Premier League of Bosnia and Herzegovina players
Serbian SuperLiga players
Montenegrin First League players
Montenegrin expatriate footballers
Expatriate footballers in Greece
Montenegrin expatriate sportspeople in Greece
Expatriate footballers in Bosnia and Herzegovina
Montenegrin expatriate sportspeople in Bosnia and Herzegovina
Expatriate footballers in Serbia
Montenegrin expatriate sportspeople in Serbia